The Hamlet is a historic set of buildings in the Weinland Park neighborhood of Columbus, Ohio. It was listed on the Columbus Register of Historic Properties in 2013 and the National Register of Historic Places in 2015.

The Hamlet consists of a 16-unit rowhouse on Fifth Avenue and a duplex adjacent to it, on Hamlet Street. The buildings were rehabilitated by a non-profit housing agency to provide affordable housing.

See also
 National Register of Historic Places listings in Columbus, Ohio

References

External links

Residential buildings on the National Register of Historic Places in Ohio

National Register of Historic Places in Columbus, Ohio
Columbus Register properties